Sali Aga Đevrlić, also known as the Rudnik Bull, was a mutesellim (local governor) of the nahiyah (Ottoman administrative district) of Rudnik in what is now Serbia at the beginning of the 19th century. He was a brother of Kučuk Alija, who was a Janissary, a mutesellim and one of four Dahiyas (leaders of rebel Janissaries) who controlled Belgrade Pashaluk from 1802 until the beginning of the First Serbian Uprising.

Biography 

Sali Aga was born to the Đevrlić family from Rudnik. Before the First Serbian Uprising he was appointed by the Dahiyas to the position of mutesellim of Rudnik nahiyah and became known for his cruelty towards the local Christian population. He was particularly proud of his nickname, "Rudnik bull", which he received because of orgies with the local Christian population that he organized for him and his men. On Sali Aga's orders Christian brides and young women were brought to his wooden house near Rudnik every Sunday to dance in front of him so he could choose the most beautiful of them.  If there was more than one bride he liked he would choose them to stay with him for the night. Sometimes he would keep a bride with him for a longer time. While they danced they sang songs dedicated to him, some of them still preserved in sources.

Sali Aga organized orgies not only in his house but at festivals in villages around Rudnik. He introduced a special 'queens' custom in every nearby village in which he chose three young women and awarded them with titles of queen, king and flag-bearer. They had to serve drink and food to him and his men and to do whatever he demanded from them. The 'flag-bearer' was in charge to hold Sali Aga's flag, the 'king' was to serve rakia which was poured in Sali Aga's mouth by the 'queen' who also fed him.

First Serbian Uprising 

At the end of February 1804, at the beginning of the First Serbian Uprising, 500 rebels commanded by Arsenije Loma and Petar Trešnjevčanin besieged Rudnik. The district was under the control of Sali Aga, reinforced by Ali Aga Džavić from Užice and Pljako from Karanovac (modern-day Kraljevo) and their 500 Janissaries. The Serbian rebel leader Karađorđe joined the besieging forces on 2 March 1804 and invited local Muslim leaders loyal to the Ottoman Sultan to join negotiations, hoping to divide them from Janissaries loyal to the Dahiyas. A leader of the local Muslims, Tokatlić, responded to Karađorđe's invitation and was given a request that Sali Aga, Džavić and Pljako should either surrender or leave Rudnik. Tokatlić soon came back with Džavić who informed Karađorđe that the three Janissary commanders accepted the request to leave Rudnik. On the following day, 3 March, they requested additional seven days to make their retreat, moved their families into the fortress and sent a messenger to Kučuk Alija requesting his help. According to Kosta S. Protić, a runaway Serb from Rudnik told Karađorđe about Sali Aga's plans. He decided to attack the town and fortress of Rudnik.

When Sali Aga realized that the Serbian rebels would attack Rudnik he decided to attack first but was defeated, leaving 86 dead Janissaries on the battlefield. Without any food in the fortress, Sali Aga had to inform Karađorđe that he would accept the Serbian demand to leave Rudnik together with Džavić, Pljako and the other Janissaries. The Serbian rebels captured Rudnik on 11 March.

References 

Civil servants from the Ottoman Empire
Ottoman military personnel of the Serbian Revolution
People from the Ottoman Empire of Serbian descent
Year of birth missing
Year of death missing